HD 183263 is an 8th magnitude subgiant star located approximately 177 light-years away in the constellation Aquila. This star is about to or already ran out of hydrogen fuel at its core and is evolving into a red giant before dying as a white dwarf. It has absolute magnitude (apparent magnitude at 10 pc) of 4.16 compared to the Sun’s 4.83, which indicates the star is more luminous than the Sun, and therefore hotter by about 100 K.

Planetary system
The star has two known planets in orbit around it. Planet b was discovered in 2005 while planet c was discovered in 2008. A 2022 study estimated the true mass of HD 183263 c at about  via astrometry, although this estimate is poorly constrained.

See also
 List of multiplanetary systems
 List of exoplanetary host stars

References

External links
 

Aquila (constellation)
G-type subgiants
183263
095740
Planetary systems with two confirmed planets
Durchmusterung objects